John Carrell (January 25, 1947 – September 20, 1989), later known as John Aubrey, was an American ice dancer and ballet dancer. With partner Lorna Dyer, he was the 1967 U.S. national champion. They were the 1967 World silver medalists and 1965-1966 World bronze medalists.
John was adopted by James and Helen (Baldwin) Carrell, and grew up in Seattle. His father James Carrell was a professor of speech and hearing at the University of Washington, and mother Helen (Baldwin) Carrell was a speech therapist for the Seattle public schools.
After retiring from competitive skating, John graduated from the University of Washington with a degree in political science.  He spent some time coaching, but decided to reinvent himself as a ballet dancer.  From 1973 to 1980, he was known as John Aubrey, a member of the National Ballet of Canada. In 1989 he died of complications resulting from AIDS.

Results
(with Lorna Dyer)

References

1947 births
1989 deaths
American male ice dancers
World Figure Skating Championships medalists
American male ballet dancers
National Ballet of Canada dancers
20th-century American ballet dancers